Chirk Tunnel is a canal tunnel near Chirk, Wales.

It lies on the Llangollen Canal, immediately northwards of the Chirk Aqueduct. The tunnel is designed for a single standard narrowboat, so passing is not possible. The tunnel is straight enough to be able to see if a boat is already inside the tunnel, and boats are required to show a light. Northbound boats must maintain power and momentum in order to push through, due to the shallow, narrow nature of the canal in the tunnel (such that water has little space to pass around the displacement of the boat), and the relatively fast  southbound current of the canal. The tunnel, the tunnel portals and the canal basin are collectively a Grade II* listed structure.

History

In 1791, the embryonic Ellesmere Canal was planning a network of canals to link the Chester Canal to Shrewsbury, with branches to Ruabon and Llangollen, Bersham, Llanymynech and possibly to Whitchurch and Wem. The promoters asked William Jessop to assess their plans, and he produced plans for a rather different route, running from the Chester Canal basin through Wrexham, Bersham, Ruabon, Pontcysyllte, Chirk, Frankton and Weston to reach Shrewsbury.

Rival parties supporting the different routes joined forces in February 1793, and the canal was authorised by Act of Parliament on 30 April of that year. A whole series of alterations and deviations had been rushed through in the intervening months, and the canal at Chirk now crossed the River Ceiriog at a different location, resulting in a shorter tunnel. The contract for the adjacent aqueduct was let in January 1796, and its construction was completed in 1801. The  of canal eastwards to Frankton was opened immediately, because of the valuable trade in limestone from the Fron Quarries. The section through the tunnel, which also passed through Whitehurst Tunnel to reach Pontcysyllte was opened in June 1802.

Walking through the tunnel
The tunnel is claimed to be the first in Britain to have a towpath running through it (along with its shorter neighbour, Whitehurst Tunnel). However, Berwick Tunnel on the Shrewsbury Canal was open by 1797 and included a towpath throughout its  length. As the tunnel at Chirk is completely unlit, it is preferable to use a torch/flashlight when walking through the tunnel, as towards the centre it is pitch black. There is however a wooden handrail along the entire length to prevent walkers falling in the canal.

See also

List of canal tunnels in the United Kingdom

Bibliography

References

External links

Canal tunnels in Wales
Llangollen Canal
Works of Thomas Telford
Tunnels completed in 1802
Grade II* listed buildings in Wrexham County Borough
Chirk